This is a list of Paleolithic sites in China. They are sorted in chronological order from the earliest founding to the latest:

List

See also
History of China
List of Bronze Age sites in China
List of Neolithic cultures of China
List of inventions and discoveries of Neolithic China
Prehistoric Asia

References

Archaeology-related lists
 
 
China
Lists of tourist attractions in China